Edward J. "Ed" Zabrocki (born January 4, 1942 in Chicago, Illinois) is a politician who served as the Mayor of Tinley Park, Illinois from May 1981 until his resignation in June 2016. During his mayoral tenure, he briefly served as a Republican member of the Illinois House of Representatives in 1995. After his resignation from the Illinois House of Representatives, local Republicans appointed John Doody, the Mayor of Homewood, Illinois to replace him. While Mayor, Zabrocki also taught at Brother Rice High School in the City of Chicago from 1965 until 2005. At Brother Rice he taught English, including a stint as the English Department Chair, and was a guidance counselor. In 2016, Zabrocki resigned as Mayor for health and family reasons. In 2017, Zabrocki was appointed by Larry Walsh, Sr., the Will County Executive, to the Will County Board of Health.

References

1942 births
Living people
20th-century American politicians
21st-century American politicians
Illinois Republicans
Mayors of places in Illinois
People from Tinley Park, Illinois